Åsa Bengtsson is a Swedish Paralympic alpine skier. She represented Sweden in Paralympic Alpine skiing at the 1994 Paralympic Winter Games in Norway, winning one gold and one bronze medal.

Career 
Bengtsson competed at the 1994 Winter Paralympics in Lillehammer. She won the gold medal in B1-2 slalom (in a time of 2:14.24, silver medal for Izaskun Manuel Llados in 2:38.84 and bronze for Silvia Parente in 4:09.33  ), and the bronze medal in the giant slalom B1-2 in 3:05.11 (on the podium, in 1st and 2nd place, the Austrian athletes Elisabeth Kellner with 2:50.31 and Gabriele Huemer with 2:52.48).  She finished fifth in the downhill race and sixth in the super-G slalom, both races held in the B1-2 category.

References 

Year of birth missing (living people)
Date of birth missing (living people)
Living people
Paralympic gold medalists for Sweden
Paralympic bronze medalists for Sweden
Paralympic alpine skiers of Sweden
Swedish female alpine skiers
Alpine skiers at the 1994 Winter Paralympics
Medalists at the 1994 Winter Paralympics